OStatus is an open standard for federated microblogging, allowing users on one website to send and receive status updates with users on another website. The standard describes how a suite of open protocols, including Atom, Activity Streams, WebSub, Salmon, and WebFinger, can be used together, which enables different microblogging server implementations to route status updates between their users back-and-forth, in near real-time.

History 

OStatus federation was first possible between StatusNet installations, such as Status.net and Identi.ca, although Identi.ca later switched to pump.io. As of June 2013, a number of other microblogging applications and content management systems had announced that they intended to implement the standard. That same month, it was announced StatusNet would be merged into the GNU social project, along with Free Social.[16]

Following the first official release of GNU Social, a number of microblogging sites running StatusNet and Free Social began to transition to it. But frustrations with the technology underpinning GNU Social led to a number of new server packages that aimed to be compatible with GNU Social using OStatus, including Mastodon (until October 2019), Pleroma, and postActiv.

Standards work 

In January 2012, a W3C Community Group was opened to maintain and further develop the OStatus standard. However, this was eclipsed by the work of the W3C Federated Social Web Working Group, launched in July 2014. This working group focused on creating a newer standard, called ActivityPub, based on the protocols used in pump.io, which has been standardized as a successor to OStatus.

Projects using OStatus

Current 

Projects in active development using OStatus for federation.
 Friendica
 GNU social (formerly StatusNet)

See also 

 OpenMicroBlogging – older federated microblogging specification, to be superseded by OStatus.
 Comparison of software and protocols for distributed social networking
 Comparison of microblogging services

References

External links 

 OStatus Wiki

Microblogging software
Communications protocols